The Furniture industry was developed many times in Egypt from the old ancient to now. During 1st 30 years of the 20th century, there was a great furniture developments in Europe from transitional furniture to Modern tastes ("Modernism"). Egyptian were influenced by these movements which was a mix of many different styles. Fahim ElGindy was the leader of this development in Egypt. He demonstrated his art in Europe and Egypt. He established the furniture industry in Damietta.

Personal 

His full name is Mohamed  Fahim  AlSayed  Abdullah  Ahmed  El Guindy. Mohamed is an Egyptian born to Turkish parents . His family belongs to one of the several branches of  El Guindy family across the Middle East, a family that has several branches in Hijaz, Yemen, Egypt, Syria, Lebanon, Turkey, and are said to be Nobles of Ali ibn Abi Talib. Mohamed's family were Silk traders; however rebellious Mohamed decided to dedicate his life to his art and furniture making becoming a pioneer in the Egyptian industry. He died on 29 April 1959 in Cairo.

Achievements 

He was known as  Fahim ElGindy. He was the man who established and developed the industry of furniture during the 20th century in  Damietta  and Egypt.  In 1926, he got the Kingdom Golden Prize from the Conference of Industrial and Agriculture of Fabricating the Furniture in Cairo. Also, He was the first Arab who got Diplomas and golden medals from Roma and Paris for his wonderful art and initiations in fabricating the furniture in 1926.

He was a pioneer in establishing the Furniture Industry. He learnt this art to many manufacturers who are very famous now in Egypt. He made two furniture centers. The first was in Damietta in 1910. The second was in Cairo in 1920. During the second Conference of Furniture Industry in Damietta in 1986, the Egyptian government appropriated his efforts by providing a certificate to his name.

Certificates  
1.Certificate of "Diploma  Di Grand Premio E Medaglia D'Oro per  Fabrique Demeubles" in 1926 from 
  "ESPOSIZIONE FIERA Campioni  Della Prodvzione Italiana Ed Internazionalie " . 
2.Certificate of "Diplóme Grand Prix avec Medaille" in 1926 from 
  "Paris Exposition D'Economie Domestique" . 
3.Certificate of "Golden Medal" in 1926 from 
  "Société Royale D'Agriculture Exposition Agricole Et Industierlle Du Caire" .

References  

Furniture makers
Egyptian businesspeople
1872 births
1959 deaths